H. Norman "Norm" Rokeberg (born January 4, 1943) was an American politician and businessman.

Born in Seattle, Washington, Rokeberg graduated from Anchorage High School in Anchorage, Alaska in 1961. He then served in the United States Army from 1964 to 1966. In 1971, Rokeberg received his bachelor's degree in political science from Willamette University. Rokeberg was in the real estate business in Anchorage, Alaska. From 1995 to 2007, Rokeberg served in the Alaska House of Representatives and was a Republican.

Notes

External links
 Norman Rokeberg at 100 Years of Alaska's Legislature
 Our Campaigns – Norm Rokeberg (AK) profile

1943 births
Living people
Politicians from Anchorage, Alaska
Politicians from Seattle
Military personnel from Seattle
Willamette University alumni
Businesspeople from Anchorage, Alaska
Republican Party members of the Alaska House of Representatives